"Hail to Old O.S.U." is the song from which the fight song for Oregon State University is based. It was written by Harold A. Wilkins in 1914 and is played mainly at sporting events like football and basketball games. The lyrics have been slightly altered since being written "to conform to a changing culture", changing to conform to new initials (O.A.C. became O.S.C., and later, O.S.U.), and the use of a more gender-neutral version.

The music and lyrics were copyrighted in 1914 and are now public domain.

The original lyrics (including original title, subheading, and punctuation)

The Fight Song
Oregon State's Fight Song is a modified version of "Hail to Old O.S.U." It consists of the chorus, a chant (O-S-U Fight B-E-A-V-E-R-S) backed by drums, and a repeat of the second half of the chorus. No verse is sung. The Oregon State University Alumni Association, owners of all rights to the song, modified the Fight Song lyrics in the 1980s to be gender neutral.

The current arrangement of "Hail to Old OSU" played by the Oregon State University Marching Band consists of the first verse, followed by the modified Fight Song. The second verse is no longer present in any modern arrangement of the song.

Hail to old OSU - Fight Song Lyrics

OSU, our hats are off to you

Beavers, Beavers, fighters through and through

We'll root for every man, we'll cheer for every stand

That's made for old OSU.

Watch our team go tearing down the field

Men of iron, their strength will never yield.

Hail, hail, hail, hail

Hail to old OSU.

References

External links
 MP3 of "Hail to Old OSU", as performed by Oregon State University Marching Band

Oregon State University
American college songs
College fight songs in the United States
Pac-12 Conference fight songs
1914 songs